LITEXPO (from Lithuanian exposition) or Lithuanian Exhibition and Congress Centre, located in Vilnius, Lithuania, is the largest exhibition centre in the Baltic states. 

Biggest hall have capacity of 1.800, while capacity of whole centre is 8.000 people.

LITEXPO organizes over twenty international exhibitions annually, including Resta (construction fair) and Vilnius Book Fair. It also organizes conferences and other special events. In December 2011, LITEXPO hosted Ministerial Council meeting of the Organization for Security and Co-operation in Europe. The Ministry of Economy owns more than 98% of the shares in LITEXPO.

References

External links 
 

Buildings and structures in Vilnius
Convention centers in Lithuania